The 2011 Dayton Silverbacks season was the sixth season for the Continental Indoor Football League (CIFL) franchise. In 2011, the Silverbacks saw several changes. They changed the franchise name from the "Miami Valley Silverbacks" to the "Dayton Silverbacks" and found a home arena in Hara Arena in Trotwood, Ohio. The Silverbacks brought back Derrick Shepard to coach the team after Brian Wells took a job with the Commandos. The Silverbacks continued their success from the following season, finished with a franchise best .500 winning percentage, and a second consecutive playoff appearance. They would go on to lose in the Semi-finals to the Marion Blue Racers.

Standings

y - clinched regular-season title

x - clinched playoff spot

Schedule

Playoff Schedule

Roster

Stats

Passing

Rushing

Receiving

Regular season

Week 2: vs Indianapolis Enforcers

Week 4: vs Port Huron Predators

Week 5: vs Marion Blue Racers

Week 6: vs Cincinnati Commandos

Week 7: vs Marion Blue Racers

Week 9: vs Chicago Knights

Week 10: vs Cincinnati Commandos

Week 11: vs Indianapolis Enforcers

Week 12: vs Chicago Knights

Week 14: vs Port Huron Predators

Playoffs

2 vs 3 Semifinal Game: vs Marion Blue Racers

References

2011 Continental Indoor Football League season
Dayton Sharks
Dayton Silverbacks